Nickel is an China based hacking group reportedly backed by the Chinese government which primarily targets government organisations.

References  

Hacker groups
Cyberattacks
Cyberattack gangs